The men's super combined competition of the Vancouver 2010 Olympics was held at Whistler Creekside in Whistler, British Columbia.  The competition was scheduled for February 16, but was postponed due to weather delays in preceding races; it was held five days later on February 21.  American athlete Bode Miller won his only Olympic gold medal, Ivica Kostelić of Croatia won silver, and Silvan Zurbriggen of Switzerland took the bronze.

One major change in this event for the 2010 Olympics was the switch from a traditional dedicated "combined" (K), taking place over one or two days and involving a downhill run and two slalom runs (as the combined had been since its reintroduction to the Olympics in 1988), to a one-day "super combined" (SC), consisting of a downhill run in the morning and one slalom run in the afternoon. The super combined format lessens the advantage of the slalom specialists.

Results

See also
Alpine skiing at the 2010 Winter Paralympics – Men's combined

References

External links
 2010 Winter Olympics results: Men's Super Combined, from vancouver2010.com; retrieved 2010-02-20.
 FIS-ski.com - 2010 Winter Olympics - results - Men's super-combined

Combined
Winter Olympics